Brodie Peak is one of the Bristly Peaks, rising to   south-southeast of Mount Castro, in the central Antarctic Peninsula. It was named by the Advisory Committee on Antarctic Names in 1977 after Earl E. Brodie, a United States Antarctic Research Program engineer in the Palmer Station winter party, 1969.

References 

Mountains of Palmer Land